HiM is a dub influenced post-rock group formed in 1995 by Doug Scharin, drummer for the bands Codeine, Rex and June of 44.  Their first album, Egg, was their most dub-based effort. Each successive album has gone more in a quasi-world music direction.  After some recording for Crooklyn Dub Consortium and Wordsound, Interpretive Belief System, HiM settled on a lineup of Scharin with Bundy K. Brown, Rob Mazurek and Jeff Parker, members or occasional members of Tortoise and Isotope 217.  Their first album was the underground hit Sworn Eyes, produced by Doug Scharin.  A few personnel changes followed, and the revamped lineup including members of June of 44. HiM released Our Point of Departure in 1999, which signified a very clear shift toward a more jazz-like sound, followed by a major American and European tour.  In 2003, HiM released Many In High Places Are Not Well on Fat Cat Records, which was received as their most successful and fully realized release. Peoples was released in mid-2006, featuring a cleaner sound with more vocals than any of HiM's previous releases.  Included in this line-up are Martin Perna and Jordan McLean from Antibalas, Griffin Rodriguez from Need New Body/Icy Demons, Adam Pierce (Mice Parade). The latest HiM records, 1110 and ん,released in 2008 and 2009 on Afterhours in Tokyo, are collaborations between Doug Scharin, Josh Larue and the Tokyo-based group, Ultra Living.

Discography 
 Crooklyn Dub Consortium – Certified Dope Vol. 1 (CD)  Chemical Mix – 1995 WordSound
 Egg – 1996 Southern Records
 Crooklyn Dub Consortium. Certified Dope, Vol. 2 (CD)   Tradition – 1996 WordSound
 Chill and Peel (12") – 1996 Southern Records
 Macro Dub Infection Volume 2 (2xCD, Comp) Liquid Boy – 1996 Virgin
 Changes / The Focus (12") – 1997 Soul Static Sound
 HiM / The Dylan Group – 1997 Bubble Core
 Interpretive Belief System – 1997 WordSound
 Sworn Eyes – 1999 Perishable Records
 5/6 In Dub (12") – 2000 Afterhours
 Our Point of Departure – 2000 Perishable Records
 New Features – 2001 Bubble Core
 Remix Series #1: Japan (12") – 2002 Afterhours/FatCat Records
 Many in High Places Are Not Well – 2003 Bubble Core/FatCat Records
 Lila (12", S/Sided, Etch) – 2003 Galaxia
 Nantes(live) – 2004 Afterhours
 15/15: Collaborations Of Sound And Visuals (CD) Hot Planes Advancing / cool planes receding – 2004 Afterhours
 Crooklyn Dub Outernational – Certified Dope Vol. 4: Babylon's Burning (CD)  Disco Lips – 2004 WordSound
 Music For Plants (2xCD)  Moss Garden – 2005 PerfectIfOn
 Sprout: The Soundtrack From the Surf Movie by Thomas Campbell – "Of The Periphery" – 2005 Brushfire Records
 Peoples – 2006 Bubble Core
 1110 – 2008 Afterhours (Japan)
 ん – 2009 Afterhours (Japan) / 2010 HipHipHip (Europe)

References

External links 

American post-rock groups
Musical groups established in 1995